Puri railway station is a terminal train station and serves Puri, the seashore temple city in the Indian state of Odisha.

History
The Khurda Road–Puri section was opened to traffic on 1 February 1897. The railway station was renovated in 2012 into a more traditional Hindu temple structure with more facilities.

Railway reorganization
The Bengal Nagpur Railway was nationalized in 1944.Eastern Railway was formed on 14 April 1952 with the portion of East Indian Railway Company east of Mughalsarai and the Bengal Nagpur Railway. In 1955, South Eastern Railway was carved out of Eastern Railway. It comprised lines mostly operated by BNR earlier. Amongst the new zones started in April 2003 were East Coast Railway  and South East Central Railway. Both these railways were carved out of South Eastern Railway.

Puri railway station to be rebuilt as world-class transit hub.

Major trains
 Purushottam Express
 Nandan Kanan Express
 Neelachal Express
 Kalinga Utkal Express
 Puri-Ahmedabad Express
 Dhauli Express
 Indore–Puri Humsafar Express
 Puri−Yesvantpur Garib Rath Express
 Puri–Howrah Garib Rath Express
 Howrah–Puri Shatabdi Express
 Sealdah–Puri Duronto Express

Gallery

References

External links
 

Railway stations in Puri district
Khurda Road railway division
Railway stations in India opened in 1897
Railway terminus in India
Indian Railway A1 Category Stations